DAESP - Departamento Aeroviário do Estado de São Paulo was the São Paulo state (in Brazil) aviation department. DAESP was part of the Secretaria de Transportes do Governo do Estado de São Paulo, and was responsible for the management of 21 public airports within the state, in accordance to directives from the National Civil Aviation Agency of Brazil (ANAC).

It was created in 1963 as Diretoria de Aeroportos of the Secretaria de Viação e Obras Públicas. This Directorate was changed to DAESP in 1966.

DAESP was extinct on April 14, 2022.

Concessions
On December 26 and 28, 2012 the management of the three airports below was transferred to their respective municipalities: 

Botucatu
Lins – Gov. Lucas Nogueira Garcez Airport Airport
Piracicaba

On March 15, 2017 the consortium Voa São Paulo was granted the concession to operate five airports previously operated by DAESP. They are: 

Bragança Paulista – Arthur Siqueira Airport
Campinas – Campo dos Amarais Airport
Itanhaém – Antônio Ribeiro Nogueira Jr. Airport
Jundiaí – Comte. Rolim Adolfo Amaro Airport
Ubatuba – Gastão Madeira Airport

On February 16, 2018 the management of the airport below was transferred to its municipality:

Ourinhos – Jornalista Benedito Pimentel Airport

On July 15, 2021 all remaining airports managed by DAESP had their concessions auctioned to private entities. The winners were the following consortia:

Consórcio Aeroportos Paulista, related to Socicam and Dix: 
Andradina
Araçatuba – Dario Guarita Airport
Assis – Marcelo Pires Halzhausen Airport
Barretos – Chafei Amsei Airport
Dracena
Penápolis
Presidente Epitácio
Presidente Prudente – Presidente Prudente Airport
São José do Rio Preto – Prof. Eribelto Manoel Reino Airport
Tupã
Votuporanga

Consórcio Rede Voa, related to Voa São Paulo:
Araraquara – Bartholomeu de Gusmão Airport
Avaré / Arandu – Comte. Luiz Gonzaga Luth Airport
Bauru / Arealva – Moussa Nakhl Tobias Airport
Franca – Ten. Lund Presotto Airport
Guaratinguetá – Edu Chaves Airport
Marília – Frank Miloye Milenkovich Airport
Registro – Alberto Bertelli State Airport
Ribeirão Preto – Dr. Leite Lopes Airport 
São Carlos – Mário Pereira Lopes Airport
São Manuel – Nelson Garófalo Airport  
Sorocaba – Bertram Luiz Leupolz Airport

List of airports once managed by DAESP
The following airports were once managed by DAESP:

Andradina
Araçatuba – Dario Guarita Airport
Araraquara – Bartolomeu de Gusmão Airport
Assis – Marcelo Pires Halzhausen Airport
Avaré / Arandu – Comte. Luiz Gonzaga Luth Airport
Barretos – Chafei Amsei Airport
Bauru / Arealva – Moussa Nakhl Tobias Airport
Botucatu
Bragança Paulista – Arthur Siqueira Airport
Campinas – Campo dos Amarais Airport
Dracena
Franca – Ten. Lund Presotto Airport
Guaratinguetá – Edu Chaves Airport
Itanhaém – Antônio Ribeiro Nogueira Jr. Airport
Jundiaí – Comte. Rolim Adolfo Amaro Airport
Lins – Gov. Lucas Nogueira Garcez Airport Airport
Marília – Frank Miloye Milenkovich Airport
Ourinhos – Jornalista Benedito Pimentel Airport
Penápolis
Piracicaba
Presidente Epitácio
Presidente Prudente – Presidente Prudente Airport
Registro – Alberto Bertelli State Airport
Ribeirão Preto – Dr. Leite Lopes Airport
São Carlos – Mário Pereira Lopes Airport
São José do Rio Preto – Prof. Eribelto Manoel Reino Airport
São Manuel – Nelson Garófalo Airport 
Sorocaba – Bertram Luiz Leupolz Airport
Tupã
Ubatuba – Gastão Madeira Airport
Votuporanga

Top 5
In 2015 those were the top 5 airports according to number of transported passengers, metric tonnes of cargo handled, and number of aircraft operations:

Number of transported passengers
1 - Ribeirão Preto – Dr. Leite Lopes Airport – 1,109,809
2 - São José do Rio Preto – Prof. Eribelto Manoel Reino Airport – 691,559
3 - Presidente Prudente – Presidente Prudente Airport – 272,204
4 - Bauru/Arealva – Moussa Nakhl Tobias Airport – 143,015
5 - Araçatuba – Dario Guarita Airport – 108,993

Metric tonnes of cargo handled
1 - Bauru/Arealva – Moussa Nakhl Tobias Airport – 1,502
2 - Ribeirão Preto – Dr. Leite Lopes Airport – 1,057
3 - Marília – Frank Miloye Milenkowichi Airport – 735
4 - Sorocaba – Bertram Luiz Leupolz Airport – 368 
5 - Jundiaí – Comte. Rolim Adolfo Amaro Airport – 357

Number of aircraft operations
1 - Jundiaí – Comte. Rolim Adolfo Amaro Airport – 81,211
2 - Sorocaba – Bertram Luiz Leupolz Airport – 61,846
3 - Campinas – Campo dos Amarais Airport – 49,385
4 - Ribeirão Preto – Dr. Leite Lopes Airport – 46,360
5 - Bragança Paulista – Arthur Siqueira Airport – 37,121

See also
List of airports in Brazil

References

External links
DAESP website

Airport operators